Hudishi is a Union council in the Balochistan province of Pakistan. Geographically, it is situated in the central-most region of the state.

Populated places in Balochistan, Pakistan